John Coleman may refer to:

Sports
 John Coleman (Australian footballer) (1928–1973), Australian rules footballer and coach for Essendon
 Tim Coleman (John George Coleman, 1881–1940), English footballer
 John Coleman (footballer, born 1946), English footballer
 John Coleman (footballer, born 1962), English football manager and former player
 John Coleman (outfielder/pitcher) (1863–1922), American professional baseball player
 John Coleman (pitcher) (1860–1915), right-handed starting pitcher in Major League Baseball
 John Coleman (Gaelic footballer) (born 1951), Irish Gaelic retired footballer
 John Coleman (rugby league), Irish rugby league player
 John Coleman (greyhound trainer) (born 1935)
 John J. Coleman, a college football player for Louisiana State University

Military
 John Coleman (VC) (1821–1858), Victoria Cross recipient
 John Coleman (Medal of Honor) (1847–1904), Medal of Honor recipient

Entertainment
 John Ery Coleman (1923–1993), American artist
 John Coleman (musician) (born 1934), British conductor and music arranger
 John Coleman (artist) (born 1949), American sculptor and painter of the American Southwest

Others
 John C. Coleman (1823–1919), California mining, railroad, and public utility magnate
 John Coleman (Australian politician) (1862–1905), New South Wales politician
 John Royston Coleman (1921–2016), economist, president of Haverford College
 John Earl Coleman (1930–2012), teacher of Vipassana meditation
 John Coleman (meteorologist) (1934–2018), co-founder of The Weather Channel
 John Coleman (psychologist) (born 1940), British author and psychologist
 John Coleman (author) (born 1935), is a British dissident thought author and former MI6 spy.

See also
Jack Coleman (disambiguation)
Jean Coleman (officer) (1908–1982), Anglo-French SOE Officer in WWII
Jon Coleman (born 1975), American professional ice hockey player
Jonathan Coleman (disambiguation)